Blanford's snowfinch (Pyrgilauda blanfordi) or the plain-backed snowfinch, is a species of bird in the sparrow family.

It is found in China, India, Nepal, and Pakistan. Its natural habitat is temperate grassland.

The species epithet and common name commemorate the English zoologist William Thomas Blanford.

References

Blanford's snowfinch
Birds of the Himalayas
Blanford's snowfinch
Blanford's snowfinch
Taxonomy articles created by Polbot